Physocnemum is a genus of beetles in the family Cerambycidae, containing the following species:

 Physocnemum andreae (Haldeman, 1847)
 Physocnemum brevilineum (Say, 1824)
 Physocnemum violaceipenne Hamilton, 1896

References

Callidiini